Leslie Victor Starr (17 January 1893 – 29 December 1954) was an Australian rules footballer who played with Carlton in the Victorian Football League (VFL).

Notes

External links 

Les Starr's profile at Blueseum

Australian rules footballers from Victoria (Australia)
Carlton Football Club players
1893 births
1954 deaths